The following is a list of The following is a list of notable deaths in February 2005.

Entries for each day are listed alphabetically by surname. A typical entry lists information in the following sequence:
 Name, age, country of citizenship at birth, subsequent country of citizenship (if applicable), reason for notability, cause of death (if known), and reference.

February 2005

1
Edward D. Freis, 92, American physician.
Edward Hay, 13th Marquess of Tweeddale, 57, Scottish aristocrat.
Anderl Heckmair, 98, Austrian mountaineer, made first ascent of the Eiger north face.
Øivind Johnsen, 82, Norwegian sports journalist and actor.
Melanie Morse MacQuarrie, 59, Scottish-born Canadian actress, heart attack.
Franco Mannino, 80, Italian film and classical composer.
John Vernon, 72, Canadian-American actor (Animal House, Dirty Harry, The Outlaw Josey Wales), following heart surgery.
Sir Jean-Pierre Warner, 80, British jurist.
Richard Wolfson, 49, British musician and journalist.

2
Birgitte Federspiel, 79, Swedish actress (Babette's Feast).
Miklós Kovacsics, 51, Hungarian Olympic handball player.
Svein Kvia, 57, Norwegian footballer.
Magomed Omarov, Russian politician, deputy Interior Minister of Dagestan.
Max Schmeling, 99, German world heavyweight boxing champion.
Sir Edward Wright, 98, British mathematician.

3
Corrado Bafile, 101, Italian cardinal.
David Hönigsberg, 45, South African composer and conductor.
Karl Linn, 81, American landscape architect and psychologist.
Ernst Mayr, 100, German-born American evolutionary biologist.
James P. Sutton, 89, American politician, U.S. Representative from Tennessee (1949–1955).
Raul Usupov, Georgian politician and deputy governor of the Kvemo Kartli region.
Zurab Zhvania, 41, Georgian politician, Prime Minister of Georgia.

4
Sir Rupert Clarke, 3rd Baronet, 85, Australian soldier and businessman.
Ossie Davis, 87, American actor (Do the Right Thing, Evening Shade, The Client) and activist, natural causes.
Nils Egerbrandt, 78, Swedish cartoonist.
Stephen R. Gregg, 90, United States Army soldier and recipient the Medal of Honor.
Luis Sánchez, 51, Venezuelan baseball player, former major league closer for the Los Angeles Angels of Anaheim.
Norwood Sothoron, 93, American soldier and athlete.

5
Otto Edler von Ballasko, 85, German World War II bomber pilot.
Bob Brannum, 79, American basketball player.
Jean-Charles Cantin, 86, Canadian politician.
Gnassingbé Eyadéma, 67, Togolese politician, president of Togo since 1967.
John Harllee, 91, American admiral.
Bob McAdorey, 69, Canadian television and radio broadcaster.
Val O'Donovan, 69, Canadian businessman and university administrator.
Günter Reimann, 100, German economist.
Michalina Wisłocka, 84, Polish sexologist.

6
Billy Baker, 84, Welsh footballer.
Uma Shankar Bajpai, 83, Indian diplomat and journalist.
Lazar Berman, 74, Russian classical pianist.
Elbert N. Carvel, 94, American politician, Governor of Delaware.
Hubert Curien, 80, French researcher, first president of European Space Agency.
Vasily Fedin, 78, Soviet Olympic cyclist.
Karl Haas, 91, US classical music radio program host.
Merle Kilgore, 70,  American country music manager and songwriter.

7
Laurie Aarons, 87, Australian politician.
Penelope Aitken, 94, English socialite and political hostess, cancer.
Atli Dam, 72, Faroese politician, former Prime Minister of the Faroe Islands.
Dennis McCord, 52, Canadian ice hockey player (Vancouver Canucks).
Vinod Chandra Pande, 72, Indian political figure, former governor of three states.
John Patterson, 64, American television director (The Sopranos, Hill Street Blues, Providence).
Madeleine Rebérioux, 84, French historian.
Paul Rebeyrolle, 78, French painter.
Peter Wallace Rodino, 95, American politician (1949–1989).
Jeremy Swan, 82, Irish cardiologist, co-inventor of the Swan-Ganz heart catheter.
Bob Turner, 71, Canadian ice hockey player (Montreal Canadiens, Chicago Blackhawks).
Zdravko Velimirović, 74, Yugoslavian film director and screenwriter.

8
Gildo Arena, 83, Italian water polo player and swimmer.
Mike Bishop, 46, American baseball player.
Camilo Delgado, 77, Puerto Rican television show host.
Edward R. Dudley, 93, American diplomat.
Helmut Eder, 88, Austrian composer.
George Herman, 85, American journalist and moderator of CBS' Face the Nation for 15 years.
Óli B. Jónsson, 86, Icelandic football player and manager.
Keith Knudsen, 56, American drummer for rock band Doobie Brothers, pneumonia.
Gaston Rahier, 58, Belgian 125cc Motocross World Champion (1975–1977).
Jimmy Smith, 76, American jazz organist.

9
Tim Breslin, 37, American ice hockey player.
William L. Campbell, 59, Canadian film editor.
Tyrone Davis, 66,  American R&B singer (Turn Back The Hands Of Time), complications of a stroke.
Antoine de Margerie, 63, French abstract painter.
John Fincham, 78, British geneticist.
Sergei Hackel, 83, British Russian Orthodox priest, theologian and broadcaster.
Robert Kearns, 77, American inventor of intermittent windshield wipers.
Frank Mathers, 80, Canadian ice hockey player (Toronto Maple Leafs, Hershey Bears).
Kate Peyton, 39, British BBC producer, shot in Mogadishu, Somalia.
Sylvia Raphael, 67, South African-born Israeli Mossad agent convicted of 1973 Lillehammer murder.

10
Humbert Balsan, 50, French film producer.
D. Allan Bromley, 79, Canadian-born American physicist, presidential advisor.
Jean Cayrol, 93, French author.
Dave Goodman, 53, British music producer.
Ben Jones, 80, Grenadian politician, former prime minister and foreign minister of Grenada.
Arthur Miller, 89, American playwright (Death of a Salesman, A View from the Bridge, The Crucible), Tony winner (1947, 1949), congestive heart failure.
Frederick W. Mote, 82, American sinologist.
Fritz Scholder, 67, American native American artist.

11
Samuel W. Alderson, 90, American inventor of crash test dummies.
Jack L. Chalker, 60, American science fiction writer.
Alex Davidson, 84, Scottish footballer.
Raymond Hermantier, 81, French actor.
Denis Ormerod, 82, British army officer.
James Porter, 70, American Catholic priest and child molester.
Stan Richards, 74, British actor (Emmerdale).

12
Manela Bustamante, 80, Cuban actress.
Archie Butterworth, 92, British racing driver and designer.
Sir John Dacie, 92, British haematologist.
Brian Kelly, 72, American actor, pneumonia.
Keith Kildey, 85, Australian cricketer.
Monem Munna, 38, Bangladeshi footballer, kidney disease.
Sammi Smith, 61, American country music singer, won Grammy for Help Me Make It Through the Night.
Dorothy Stang, 74, American nun, murdered in Anapu, Brazil.
Marinus van der Goes van Naters, 104, Dutch politician.
Rafael Vidal, 41, Venezuelan Olympic medalist, car crash.

13
Samineni Arulappa, 80, Indian Roman Catholic archbishop.
Harry Baird, 73, Guyanese-born British actor.
Nelson Briles, 61, American baseball pitcher.
Sixten Ehrling, 86, Swedish conductor.
Mary Hallaren, 97, American soldier, first woman to join the United States Army.
Emilios T. Harlaftis, 39, Greek astrophysicist.
Lúcia dos Santos, 97, Portuguese nun, last survivor of the three shepherd children of the Fatima apparition in 1917.
Maurice Trintignant, 87, French racing driver, twice winner of the Monaco Grand Prix.
Peter White, 69, Australian politician.
Billy Howard, 54, American football player

14
Owen A. Allred, 91, American leader of the Apostolic United Brethren.
Cicely Pearl Blair, 78, British dermatologist.
Ron Burgess, 87, Welsh footballer with Tottenham Hotspur and Wales.
Vic Emery, 84, Australian cricketer.
Tatiana Gritsi-Milliex, 85, Greek novelist and journalist.
Rafik Hariri, 60, Lebanese business tycoon and politician, twice Prime Minister of Lebanon, car bomb.
Aubelin Jolicoeur, 81, Haitian journalist and columnist.
Otto Plaschkes, 75, British film producer (Georgy Girl).
Mike Rawding, 68, English football coach and administrator.
Najai Turpin, 23, American boxer, participant in boxing reality show "The Contender", suicide.
Dick Weber, 75, American professional bowler, father of Pete Weber.

15
Carlo Tullio Altan, 88, Italian anthropologist and sociologist.
Pierre Bachelet, 60, French singer.
Samuel T. Francis, 57, U.S. political columnist.
Dudu Geva, 54, Israeli cartoonist.
Paul Lacy, 81, U.S. research scientist, father of islet cell transplantation for treatment of Type I diabetes.
David Leach, 93, English potter.
Nathan Quao, 89, Ghanaian diplomat.

16
Michael Aikman, 71, Australian rower.
Hans von Blixen-Finecke Jr., 88, Swedish Olympic equestrian.
Cecilia Cubas, 32, Paraguayan daughter of former President Raúl Cubas Grau, kidnap victim (body found).
Nicole DeHuff, 31, American actress (Meet the Parents, Suspect Zero, CSI: Miami), pneumonia.
Michael McCrum, 80, British academic and educator.
Bill Potts, 76, American jazz pianist and arranger, cardiac arrest.
Narriman Sadek, (Nariman Sadeq), 70, Egyptian queen, ex-wife of King Farouk, last queen of Egypt.
Marcello Viotti, 50, Italian conductor.
Gerry Wolff, 84, German actor.

17
F. M. Busby, 83, American science fiction writer.
Peter Foy, 79, American theatrical flying effects specialist.
Jens Martin Knudsen, 74, Danish astrophysicist.
César Marcelak, 92, French cycling champion.
Dan O'Herlihy, 85, Irish actor (RoboCop, Robinson Crusoe, Fail Safe).
Omar Sivori, 69, Argentinian and Italian footballer.

18
Avraham Biton, 81, Israeli politician.
Brian Cookman, 58, British musician.
Uli Derickson, 60, German-born American airline stewardess, protagonist in 1985 airplane hijacking, cancer.
Marian Kamil Dziewanowski, 91, Polish-American historian.
Gwendolyn Knight, 91, American artist.
Harald Szeemann, 71, Swiss curator and art historian.

19
Cardon V. Burnham, 77, American musician.
Li Baohua, 95, Chinese politician.
Angel M. Marchand, 92, Puerto Rican clinician and Olympic sport shooter
Kihachi Okamoto, (岡本喜八), 81, Japanese film director, esophageal cancer
Giuseppe Piromalli, 83, Italian 'Ndrangheta boss
Peter Pryor, 74, Australian Olympic cyclist

20
Rachel Bissex, 48, American folk singer/songwriter.
Pam Bricker, 50, American jazz vocalist and music professor, suicide.
Julius D. Canns, 82, American politician.
Sandra Dee, 62, American actress (Gidget, Imitation of Life, Until They Sail), kidney failure and pneumonia.
Sir William Gordon Harris, 92, British civil engineer.
Dalene Matthee, 67, Afrikaans-South African author, heart failure.
Raymond Mhlaba, 85, South African political leader and the first Premier of the Eastern Cape.
John Raitt, 88, American classic Broadway star and father of Bonnie Raitt, pneumonia.
Hunter S. Thompson, 67, American journalist, suicide.
Jimmy Young, 56, American boxer, heart failure.

21
Zdzisław Beksiński, 75, Polish artist.
Ara Berberian, 74, American Bass with the New York City Metropolitan Opera.
Gérard Bessette, 84, Canadian writer and academic.
Isabelle Goldenson, 84, American co-founder of United Cerebral Palsy.
Guillermo Cabrera Infante, 75, Cuban novelist, essayist, translator, screenwriter, exiled to London.
Roger Johnson, 70, American businessman and government official.
Josef Metternich, 89, German operatic baritone.
Gene Scott, 75, U.S. televangelist and author.
Don Tolhurst, 75, Australian Olympic shooter.
Ernest Vandiver, 86, American politician, former governor of the U.S. state of Georgia (1959–1963).

22
David Bradford, 66, American economist.
Leo Brewer, 85, American chemist.
Kuntowijoyo,61, Indonesian writer and literaturer
John A. Dillon, 81-82, American physicist.
Father Luigi Giussani, 82, Italian Catholic priest, founder of the "Communion and Liberation" Catholic youth movement.
Heath Lamberts, 63, Canadian actor.
Lee Eun-ju, (이은주), 24, Korean actress, suicide.
Claus Leininger, 74, German stage director.
Mario Ricci, 90, Italian cyclist.
Reggie Roby, 43, American college and professional football player, retired NFL punter.
Harry Simeone, 94, American music arranger, conductor and composer, co-authored Christmas songs (Little Drummer Boy).
Simone Simon, 94, French actress.
Åke Strömmer, 68, Swedish sports journalist, cancer.

23
All Along, 25, French racehorse.
Sir John Carter, 86, Guyanese diplomat.
José Cruxent, Venezuelan archaeologist.
Tom Patterson, 84, Canadian founder of the Stratford Festival of Canada.
Feng Yidai, Chinese author and translator.
Henk Zeevalking, 82, Dutch politician and co-founder of Democrats 66.

24
John Barron, 75, American journalist.
Jochen Bleicken, 78, German ancient historian.
Thadée Cisowski, 78, Polish-born French footballer, scored 206 goals in the French top division.
Sumner Gerard, 88, American politician and diplomat
Robin Jenkins, 92, Scottish novelist, author of "The Cone-Gatherers" and "Fergus Lamont".
Hugh Nibley, 94, American historian, primarily concerned with the Church of Jesus Christ of Latter-day Saints.
Gustavo Vázquez Montes, 42, Mexican politician, incumbent governor of Colima, Mexico, aviation accident.
Sir Glanmor Williams, 84, Welsh historian.
Hans-Jürgen Wischnewski, 82, German politician and former cabinet minister.

25
Abdullah Badran, 21, Palestinian suicide bomber.
Peter Benenson, 83, British lawyer and founder of Amnesty International.
Ben Bowen, 2, American child cancer victim, focus of fund raising initiative.
Phoebe Hesketh, 96, British poet.
Don LeJohn, 70, American baseball player, former Los Angeles Dodgers third baseman.
Norberto "Pappo" Napolitano, 54, Argentine blues and rock n' roll guitarist and composer.
Tony Norris, 88, British ornithologist.
Edward Patten, 66, American soul singer, member of Gladys Knight & The Pips.
Atef Sedki, 74, Egyptian politician, prime minister.

26
Denise Berthoud, 88, Swiss lawyer.
Max Faulkner, 88, British golfer.
Henry Grunwald, 82, Austrian-American journalist and diplomat, former managing editor of TIME and U.S. ambassador to Austria (1988–1990).
Witness Mangwende, 59, Zimbabwean politician and diplomat, Minister of Foreign Affairs (1981–1987)
Jef Raskin, 61, American creator of the Apple Macintosh, pancreatic cancer.
Johnny Williams, 77, American football player.

27
James Avati, 92, American illustrator.
Harold Burnell Carter, 95, Australian scientist.
Ed Clary, 88, American football and baseball player.
Harold Geller, 89, Australian-American conductor and composer.
Michael Hudson, 71, Australian navy officer.
Hiroyuki Nasu, 53, Japanese film director.
Frank V. Ortiz Jr., 78, American diplomat.
Pukazhenthi, 75, Indian music film director.
Carl Taseff, 76, American football player, former NFL defensive back and assistant coach.

28
Evgeny Alekseev, 85, Soviet/Russian basketball player and coach.
Chris Curtis, 63, English drummer with The Searchers.
Louis Frommelt, 61, Liechtenstein Olympic shooter.
Phil Fuemana, 41, New Zealand musician, heart attack.
Mario Luzi, 90, Italian poet.
Édouard Stern, 50, French banker, murdered

References

2005-02
 02